New Amsterdam Airport  is an airport serving the city of New Amsterdam in the East Berbice-Corentyne Region of Guyana.

See also

 List of airports in Guyana
 Transport in Guyana

References

External links
Bing Maps - New Amsterdam
OurAirports - New Amsterdam

Airports in Guyana
New Amsterdam, Guyana